Périgny is a commune in the Charente-Maritime department, southwestern France. Its inhabitants are named the Pérignaciens and Pérignaciennes. Perigny is fully part of the unité urbaine of La Rochelle extending its eastern urban toward Dompierre-sur-Mer. Following the quick urban growth, it has become the 3rd town of the La Rochelle area and the 8th town of the Charente-Maritime department.

Population

See also
Communes of the Charente-Maritime department

References

External links
 

Communes of Charente-Maritime
Charente-Maritime communes articles needing translation from French Wikipedia